Pey Qaleh may refer to:
 Pey Qaleh, Mazandaran
 Pey Qaleh, West Azerbaijan